Speedy Oteria Long (June 16, 1928 – October 5, 2006) was an American politician who served in the United States House of Representatives for Louisiana's 8th congressional district from January 3, 1965, until January 3, 1973. He was a member of the Long family, a cousin of Huey Long, Earl K. Long, Russell Long, and Gillis William Long.

Life and career
Speedy Oteria Long was born in Tullos, Louisiana, in La Salle Parish on June 16, 1928. He was given the name Speedy because he was born prematurely. He attended public schools in LaSalle and Winn Parish, graduating in 1945 from Winnfield High School. He served in the United States Navy from April 1946 to February 1948.

Long attended college at Northeast Junior College in Monroe, Louisiana, graduating in 1950, and then at Northwestern State College in Natchitoches, Louisiana, from which he graduated in 1951.  He was recalled to active duty in the Navy from September 1951 to December 1952, then graduated from Louisiana State University Law School in Baton Rouge in February 1959. Long was admitted to the Louisiana bar in 1959 and began the practice of law in Jena, Louisiana.

Long was elected to the Louisiana State Senate and served from May 1956 to May 1964, after which he ran in the primary to be the Democratic nominee for election to United States House of Representatives representing Louisiana's 8th congressional district.  His opponent in the primary was the incumbent, his cousin Gillis Long.

Both of the Longs were segregationists but Gillis Long was less outspoken in his views than Speedy Long was, and Gillis had also, according to Speedy, aided the passage of the Civil Rights Act of 1964 by voting to increase the size of the House Rules Committee from 12 to 15 members, thus diluting the South's influence on the committee.  Speedy used the slogan "Vote Against the Man Who Voted Against the South" in the campaign against Gillis.  A state senator from New Orleans described the difference between the two Longs: Speedy was "a redneck" with a regional focus, while Gillis was "a cosmopolitan". In the primary, Speedy Long easily beat Gillis Long. Speedy's campaign in the general election was limited to a single 150-second television appearance. Although the Republican Presidential candidate, Barry Goldwater, carried the district, Democrat Speedy Long won election handily, becoming the sixth member of the Long family to serve in the United States Congress.

Long served in the 89th (1965–1967), 90th (1967–1969), 91st (1969–1971), and 92nd (1971–1973) Congresses, but did not stand for re-election in 1972.

From  January 4, 1973, to January 3, 1985, Long was the district attorney for Louisiana's 28th Judicial District.

Long died on October 5, 2006, in Trout, Louisiana.

References

Democratic Party members of the United States House of Representatives from Louisiana
20th-century American politicians
People from LaSalle Parish, Louisiana
Northwestern State University alumni
Democratic Party Louisiana state senators
District attorneys in Louisiana
20th-century American lawyers
Speedy
1928 births
2006 deaths